The Frugga Nature Reserve is located in the municipality of Bø in Nordland county, Norway.

It includes the small island of Frugga and many small skerries. The area is protected in order to safeguard an Atlantic puffin nesting area. The nature reserve was established on December 6, 2002.

References

External links
 Nykvåg/Nykan, Nyke/Tussen og Frugga. Map and description of the nature reserve.
 Miljøverndepartementet. 2002. Frugga naturreservat, Bø kommune, Nordland. 1:25,500 map of the nature reserve.

Nature reserves in Norway
Protected areas of Nordland
Bø, Nordland
Protected areas established in 2002